Oliver Wendell "Patsy" Tebeau (December 5, 1864 – May 16, 1918) was an American first baseman, third baseman, and manager in Major League Baseball.

Career
Tebeau was born in St. Louis, Missouri, in 1864. His brother, George Tebeau, was also an MLB player.

Patsy started his professional baseball career with the Western League's St. Joseph Reds in 1886. The following season, while playing for Denver of the WL, he had a .424 batting average in 94 games. Tebeau made his major league debut with the National League's Chicago White Stockings in September of that year. In 20 games with Chicago, he batted .162. He then played in the Western Association in 1888. In 1889, Tebeau joined the NL's Cleveland Spiders and batted .282. The following year, he was a player-manager for the Cleveland Infants of the Players' League. In 1891, Tebeau returned to the Spiders and was a player-manager for the team until 1898. His lowest batting average with the Spiders was .244 in 1892, and his highest was .329 in 1893. The Spiders never finished a full season in first place in the National League, but Tebeau's team benefited from the season structure in 1892, 1895 and 1896; the 1892 season was a split-season that found Cleveland as the winner of the second half and the right to play in the World's Championship Series (the pre-modern postseason before the World Series). They would compete in the next rendition of postseason play in the League with the Temple Cup that matched the first and second place teams, and Cleveland would win once. 

In March 1899, the Spiders assigned Tebeau to the St. Louis Perfectos. He managed the team before quitting in the middle of the 1900 season. Tebeau is one of just over a dozen managers to have won at least 400 games in the 19th century.

In his 13-year MLB career, Tebeau played 1,167 games and batted .279 with 27 home runs and 735 runs batted in. His managing record was 726–583–30. He was known for verbally abusing umpires and opposing players, for which he was criticized by journalists.

After retiring from baseball, Tebeau ran a saloon in St. Louis. His wife left him, and in 1918, he committed suicide by shooting himself in the head.

Managerial record

See also
 List of Major League Baseball player-managers

References

Notes

External links 

 Retrosheet
 

1864 births
1918 suicides
19th-century baseball players
Major League Baseball first basemen
Major League Baseball third basemen
Major League Baseball player-managers
Chicago White Stockings players
Cleveland Spiders players
Cleveland Infants players
St. Louis Perfectos players
St. Louis Cardinals players
Cleveland Spiders managers
St. Louis Cardinals managers
St. Joseph Reds players
Denver (minor league baseball) players
Omaha Omahogs players
Omaha Lambs players
Minneapolis Millers (baseball) players
Baseball players from St. Louis
Suicides by firearm in Missouri
1918 deaths
Sportspeople from St. Louis